Vimentin is a structural protein that in humans is encoded by the VIM gene. Its name comes from the Latin vimentum which refers to an array of flexible rods.

Vimentin is a type III intermediate filament (IF) protein that is expressed in mesenchymal cells. IF proteins are found in all animal cells as well as bacteria. Intermediate filaments, along with tubulin-based microtubules and actin-based microfilaments, comprises the cytoskeleton. All IF proteins are expressed in a highly developmentally-regulated fashion; vimentin is the major cytoskeletal component of mesenchymal cells. Because of this, vimentin is often used as a marker of mesenchymally-derived cells or cells undergoing an epithelial-to-mesenchymal transition (EMT) during both normal development and metastatic progression.

Structure 

A vimentin monomer, like all other intermediate filaments, has a central α-helical domain, capped on each end by non-helical amino (head) and carboxyl (tail) domains. Two monomers are likely co-translationally expressed in a way that facilitates their formation of a coiled-coil dimer, which is the basic subunit of vimentin assembly.

The α-helical sequences contain a pattern of hydrophobic amino acids that contribute to forming a "hydrophobic seal" on the surface of the helix. In addition, there is a periodic distribution of acidic and basic amino acids that seems to play an important role in stabilizing coiled-coil dimers. The spacing of the charged residues is optimal for ionic salt bridges, which allows for the stabilization of the α-helix structure. While this type of stabilization is intuitive for intrachain interactions, rather than interchain interactions, scientists have proposed that perhaps the switch from intrachain salt bridges formed by acidic and basic residues to the interchain ionic associations contributes to the assembly of the filament.

Function 

Vimentin plays a significant role in supporting and anchoring the position of the organelles in the cytosol. Vimentin is attached to the nucleus, endoplasmic reticulum, and mitochondria, either laterally or terminally.

The dynamic nature of vimentin is important when offering flexibility to the cell. Scientists found that vimentin provided cells with a resilience absent from the microtubule or actin filament networks, when under mechanical stress in vivo. Therefore, in general, it is accepted that vimentin is the cytoskeletal component responsible for maintaining cell integrity. (It was found that cells without vimentin are extremely delicate when disturbed with a micropuncture). Transgenic mice that lack vimentin appeared normal and did not show functional differences. It is possible that the microtubule network may have compensated for the absence of the intermediate network. This result supports an intimate interaction between microtubules and vimentin. Moreover, when microtubule depolymerizers were present, vimentin reorganization occurred, once again implying a relationship between the two systems. On the other hand, wounded mice that lack the vimentin gene heal slower than their wild type counterparts.

In essence, vimentin is responsible for maintaining cell shape, integrity of the cytoplasm, and stabilizing cytoskeletal interactions. Vimentin has been shown to eliminate toxic proteins in JUNQ and IPOD inclusion bodies in asymmetric division of mammalian cell lines.

Also, vimentin is found to control the transport of low-density lipoprotein, LDL, -derived cholesterol from a lysosome to the site of esterification. With the blocking of transport of LDL-derived cholesterol inside the cell, cells were found to store a much lower percentage of the lipoprotein than normal cells with vimentin. This dependence seems to be the first process of a biochemical function in any cell that depends on a cellular intermediate filament network. This type of dependence has ramifications on the adrenal cells, which rely on cholesteryl esters derived from LDL.

Vimentin plays a role in aggresome formation, where it forms a cage surrounding a core of aggregated protein.

Clinical significance 

It has been used as a sarcoma tumor marker to identify mesenchyme. Its specificity as a biomarker has been disputed by Jerad Gardner.

Methylation of the vimentin gene has been established as a biomarker of colon cancer and this is being utilized in the development of fecal tests for colon cancer. Statistically significant levels of vimentin gene methylation have also been observed in certain upper gastrointestinal pathologies such as Barrett's esophagus, esophageal adenocarcinoma, and intestinal type gastric cancer. High levels of DNA methylation in the promoter region have also been associated with markedly decreased survival in hormone positive breast cancers.
Downregulation of vimentin was identified in cystic variant of papillary thyroid carcinoma using a proteomic approach.
See also Anti-citrullinated protein antibody for its use in diagnosis of rheumatoid arthritis.

Vimentin was discovered to be an attachment factor for SARS-CoV-2 by Nader Rahimi and colleagues.

Interactions 

Vimentin has been shown to interact with: 
 DSP 
 MEN1 
 MYST2 
 PKN1 
 PRKCI
 PLEC 
 SPTAN1 
 UPP1
 YWHAZ

The 3' UTR of Vimentin mRNA has been found to bind a 46kDa protein.

References

Further reading

External links 
 Vimentin Images

Cytoskeleton
Cell biology
Tumor markers